Bulkeley is a village and civil parish in the unitary authority of Cheshire East and the ceremonial county of Cheshire, England. In the 2011 census it had a population of 239.

History
The name was first recorded as Bulceleia in 1086, from Old English bulluc + leah, "pasture where bullocks graze".

Bulkeley was previously a township in Malpas parish, Broxton Hundred. Between 1894 and 1974 the civil parish was part of Nantwich Rural District.

Governance
Bulkeley is administered jointly with Ridley by Bulkeley and Ridley Parish Council. From 1974 the civil parish was served by Crewe and Nantwich Borough Council, which was succeeded on 1 April 2009 by the new unitary authority of Cheshire East. Bulkeley falls in the parliamentary constituency of Eddisbury, which has been represented by Edward Timpson since 2019, after being represented by Stephen O'Brien (1999–2015) and Antoinette Sandbach (2015–19).

Geography and economy

Bulkeley Hill forms the southern end of the Peckforton Hills. It is owned by the National Trust, and its wooded slopes include 12 acres (5 hectares) of semi-natural ancient woodland. The hill has been designated a county site of biological importance for its woodland and grassland habitats. A wider area covering the northern part of the civil parish has also been designated an Area of Special County Value.

Formerly owned by Staffordshire Potteries Water Board, the facility is now operated by Severn Trent Water.

The land use is predominantly agricultural, with cattle pasture, horse paddocks and some arable land.

Demography

According to the 2001 census the civil parish had a population of 240 in 106 households. 
The population at the 2011 census had reduced marginally to 239.
These figures represent an increase from the 1951 population; the historical population figures were 184 (1801), 197 (1851), 168 (1901) and 146 (1951).

Places of worship
Bulkeley Methodist Church is a red-brick chapel in Bulkeley village. Dating from 1861, it was formerly the Jubilee Primitive Methodist Chapel and is listed at grade II.

Other landmarks

Bulkeley Hall is a three-storey mansion in brown brick which dates from the mid-18th century; it is grade II* listed. Springfield Cottage is a timber-framed cottage dating from the late 17th century. A former corn mill stands on Mill Lane to the north of Bulkeley village.

Bulkeley Grange is a grade-II-listed Victorian red-brick mansion in Jacobean style; the house was rebuilt by railway builder, Thomas Brassey, in 1843. A monument consisting of four inscribed sandstone pillars connected by iron straps was erected around an oak tree near The Grange in 1845, to commemorate Brassey's fortieth birthday. In 2007, it was moved to a location just to the east of Bulkeley village, adjacent to the A534; the site has an interpretative sign.

Transport
The A534 (Wrexham Road) between Nantwich and Wrexham runs east–west across the civil parish. Other through routes include Stone House Lane, which runs from the A534 to Peckforton. Mill Lane connects Stone House Lane with the A534 and Cholmondeley Lane runs south to Bulkelehay. The Sandstone Trail long-distance footpath runs over Bulkeley Hill.

Education

Bulkeley civil parish falls within the catchment areas of Bickerton Holy Trinity CE Primary School in Bickerton and Bishop Heber High School in Malpas.

See also

Listed buildings in Bulkeley

References

External links

A Vision of Britain Through Time: Bulkeley Tn/CP

Villages in Cheshire
Civil parishes in Cheshire
National Trust properties in Cheshire